Northern Railroad may refer to:

Northern Railroad (New Hampshire), predecessor of the Boston and Maine Railroad
Northern Rail Trail (New Hampshire), the current facility using the NH Northern Railroad line
Northern Railroad of New Jersey, predecessor of the Erie Railroad
Northern Railroad (New York), 1845-1865, predecessor of the Rutland Railroad

See also
Northern Railway (disambiguation)